Contra Latopolis (sometime named Al Hilla 
or El-Hella) is an Egyptian temple.

During the reign of Cleopatra VII, a temple to Isis  was built opposite Latopolis, or Esne as it is now known, on the other side of the Nile from this settlement. The Roman people having constructed this, named the building Contra Latopolis. Very little has survived into the current age of this construction, all but a "massive portico upheld by two rows of four columns each"

The temple built together with these mentioned structures includes, positioned on the overhanging eaves, a globe with wings outstretched to either side. The walls of the building were found covered with hieroglyphic writing. Of the names amongst them, the earliest of these showed Cleopatra Cocce (Cleopatra III), and her son Ptolemy Soter, the most recently written showed the name of Emperor Commodus, the decorations were made between the reign of Cleopatra III and Soter II.

The columns of a building in Contra Latopolis are said by Maspero to date from construction during the Ptolemic period, the columns of buildings from Contra Latopolis considered particularly distinct examples of a formal order of architecture where the god Hathor is placed as capitals upon the columns of temples.

See also
List of ancient Egyptian sites, including sites of temples

References

External links
Al Hillah Map interactive is available under Creative Commons Attribution-ShareAlike 3.0. mapcarta.com
 The Notitia Dignitatum and the Geography of Egypt s.a. Notitia Dignitatum
Gaston Camille Charles Maspero, Manual Of Egyptian Archaeology And Guide To The Study Of Antiquities In Egypt
Engraving of "Remains of the Temple at Latopolis in Upper Egypt" (1806/1810) published in Cavendish Pelham, The world, or, The present state of the universe : being a general and complete collection of modern voyages and travels / selected, arranged and digested from the narratives of the latest and most authentic travellers and navigators.

Ancient Roman temples
Archaeological sites in Egypt
Egyptian temples
Roman sites in Egypt